Club Airways International is an airline based in Meyrin, Switzerland, near Geneva. It operates business jets for its members. Its main base is Geneva Cointrin International Airport.

History 

The airline was established in December 2002 and started operations in February 2003. It is a subsidiary of United Kingdom-based Club 328.

Fleet 

The Club Airways International fleet includes the following aircraft (at January 2005):

 Cessna Citation Bravo
 Falcon 20

References

External links
Club Airways International
Club Airways International 

Airlines established in 2002